St. Hilda's & St. Hugh's School is an independent, Episcopal day school in New York City. It is located in Morningside Heights on the Upper West Side of Manhattan. The youngest students are beginners (2 or 3 years old), and students graduate when they complete eighth grade.

History 
St. Hilda’s & St. Hugh’s (SHSH) was founded 1950 by Sister Edith Margaret and the Reverend Mother Ruth (Ruth Elaine Younger). Mother Ruth, a biracial nun from Harlem, obtained her bachelor's degree from St. Hilda's College, University of Toronto. She obtained her master's degree and doctorate in education from Columbia University. Having suffered personally from racial discrimination, Mother Ruth sought to create a school that would be inclusive and welcome diverse groups of students and their families:  “I hope that an Episcopalian who attends our school becomes a better Episcopalian, a Jewish child a better Jew, and an agnostic a better agnostic.” In 2016, 50 percent of students come from diverse ethnic backgrounds.

In 1992, SHSH’s Board of Trustees made the decision to close SHSH's upper school (grades 9 through 12) at the end of the 1992-93 school year.

Curriculum 
Accredited by NYSAIS, St. Hilda's & St. Hugh's follows a classical liberal arts curriculum. Students begin second language study at the nursery level, with instruction three or more days a week. Parents select from Spanish, French, or Mandarin Chinese. Latin is compulsory and added in seventh grade.
Art and music instruction begin in early childhood. Formal performing arts curriculum begins in fourth grade.

Daily physical education begins in senior kindergarten. Weekly movement classes take place in beginners, nursery, and junior kindergarten. 
The school is a member of the sports consortium NYCAL. In middle school students may participate in the following team sports: soccer, track and field, volleyball, cross-country, basketball, softball, baseball. Noncompetitive sports offerings for grades 7–8 include yoga, dance, and martial arts.

Traditions 
Community service projects take place throughout each academic year and involve students in all grades. Among the school's more notable community service traditions is the Thanksgiving Food Chain, which takes place the day before Thanksgiving each year. Students line up and pass food donations from hand to hand down the block to Broadway Presbyterian Church, which maintains a food pantry and soup kitchen.

In 2006, in the aftermath of the 2004 Indian Ocean earthquake and tsunami, St. Hilda’s & St. Hugh’s helped to rebuild a school in Chengalpattu, India, now called CSI St. Hilda's & St. Hugh's. Enrollment now exceeds 1,000 students, many of whom are members of the Dalit community, who would not previously have had access to formal education.

In 2014, St. Hilda's & St. Hugh's began a pilot program to work with St. Pierre Community School in Madras, Haiti, a northern fishing village.

A uniform consisting of a white shirt and blue or plaid skirt for girls, and tan pants for boys, is compulsory for students in grades 1–8.

Upper division students (grades 4–8) attend Eucharist on Thursday, and students in grades 1–8 attend Chapel on all other days.

Every year, the school presents a Christmas pageant that was written by Madeleine L’Engle, the renowned author of a Wrinkle in Time, who was a member of the faculty when the novel was published. All students from nursery through 8th grade participate in the pageant, which is always held on the last day before Christmas break.

Facility 

The current school building is an 80,000-square-foot self-contained campus that was constructed in 1967. Renovations have taken place since 2004 to update the facility. Building features include:
 Interactive touch screens in every classroom (grades senior kindergarten and up)
 Micro-kitchens in classrooms through fifth grade  
 Three age-appropriate science labs
 500 sq. foot rooftop greenhouse 
 2,600 sq. foot library with nearly 25,000 volumes
 7,400 sq. foot outdoor playdeck with age-appropriate play zones
 Regulation-size gymnasium with stage 
 1,100 sq. foot indoor play space with climbing wall 
 Three art studios with kiln, etching press, and woodworking shop 
 Chapel with Rieger organ 
 Three music studios

Exmission 
Graduates of St. Hilda's & St. Hugh's go on to attend a variety of day, boarding and specialized public high schools.

Notable alumni 
Evan Flatow (Class of 1973), President of Mount Sinai Hospital 
Anthony Michael Hall, actor
Matthew Anchel (Class of 2001), Bass (Metropolitan Opera) 
Adam Rafferty, Fingerstyle Guitarist
Fiona Apple, singer/songwriter
Coral Peña, actor
Dan Kluger, chef
Anne C. Bailey (Class of 1982), scholar and author

References

External links 
 

Morningside Heights, Manhattan
Private elementary schools in Manhattan
Private middle schools in Manhattan
Schools in Harlem